A Breath of Scandal (released as Olympia in Italy) is a 1960 American/Italian international co-production romantic comedy-drama film directed by Michael Curtiz, based on the stage play Olympia by Ferenc Molnár. It stars Sophia Loren, Maurice Chevalier, and John Gavin, with Angela Lansbury, Milly Vitale, Roberto Risso, Isabel Jeans, and Tullio Carminati. The film is set at the turn of the 20th century and features lush technicolor photography of Vienna and the countryside of Austria. The costumes and lighting were designed by George Hoyningen-Huene and executed by Ella Bei of the Knize fashion house (Austria). In part because Loren was at odds with Curtiz's direction, Italian director Vittorio De Sica was hired to reshoot certain scenes with Loren after hours without Curtiz's knowledge.

The film is based on the 1928 play Olympia rather than being a remake of the 1929 MGM film His Glorious Night.

Plot
In 1907, a widowed Princess Olympia of the Austro-Hungarian Empire has been banished from the Imperial Court to her late husband's country estate. The bored Princess spends her time improving her rifle marksmanship by using flowers, statues and the postman as her targets. When she tires of that, being an expert equestrienner as well as an expert markswoman, she rides a wild stallion to her hunting lodge. On the way she is thrown from her mount by the appearance of an automobile driven by a visiting American mining engineer Charlie Foster. She feigns injury to get to know Charlie better as she keeps her royal heritage a secret from him, for Charlie believes her a peasant. Treating her with his first aid expertise, Charlie gives her his own pyjamas but mistakenly gives her a sleeping pill with a glass of wine that sends Olympia into a deep sleep.

Waking in Charlie's pyjama top, but not the bottom, Olympia fears the worst has happened and flees back home where news as arrived that she is able to return to the Imperial Court in Vienna. Olympia is greeted by the news by her mother that she is to be married to Prince Ruprecht of Prussia. She is also reunited with Charlie who has come to see her father Prince Philip about mining and refining bauxite in the Empire. Her rival Countess Lina is determined to ruin Princess Olympia's life by informing the Imperial Chamberlain Count Sandor of Olympia's scandalous conduct with the American.

Cast
 Sophia Loren as Princess Olympia
 Maurice Chevalier as Prince Philip
 John Gavin as Charlie Foster
 Angela Lansbury as Countess Lina
 Isabel Jeans as Princess Eugénie
 Tullio Carminati as Albert
 Milly Vitale as can-can girl
 Carlo Hinterman as Prince Ruprecht
 Roberto Risso as aide de camp
 Friedrich von Ledebur as Count Sandor
 Adrienne Gessner as Amelia

Production
The film was part of a three-picture deal, which Loren had, under contract with Paramount. It was also a co-production between Paramount and producers Ponti and Girosi. Filming started on June 1, 1959, in Vienna.

John Gavin, who had been borrowed from Universal-International, later recalled, "we were being directed by Michael Curtiz, which sounds so good on paper." Apparently, he soon realized the director was past it. I said to Sophia [during the shoot], "We're in a terrible picture. He may have been a great director once but he doesn't know what he's doing."

According to Gavin, Loren had looked worried and asked, "Do you really think so?"

Gavin said, "The next thing I know Vittorio De Sica is turning up on set, at 2:00am every morning to give Sophia a few hours coaching before shooting started. Imagine! Drama classes at that hour! Still, I wouldn't have minded a little help myself. So I asked him and he said 'Don't change a thing. Everything you do is so American.' That sort of left me up in the air without a compass."

Reception
Gavin later called the film a "turkey" saying Loren playing a princess was "not what she does best."

See also
 List of American films of 1960

References

External links
 
 
 
 

1960 films
1960 comedy-drama films
1960s English-language films
1960s romantic comedy-drama films
American films based on plays
American romantic comedy-drama films
English-language Italian films
Films about royalty
Films based on works by Ferenc Molnár
Films directed by Michael Curtiz
Films directed by Vittorio De Sica
Films produced by Carlo Ponti
Films scored by Alessandro Cicognini
Films scored by Robert Stolz
Films set in the 1900s
Films set in Austria
Films shot in Rome
Films shot in Vienna
Films with screenplays by Walter Bernstein
Italian films based on plays
Italian romantic comedy-drama films
Paramount Pictures films
Titanus films
1960s American films
1960s Italian films